Parathelphusinae is a subfamily of freshwater crabs, which was formerly placed in the family Parathelphusidae; they are mainly found in South and Southeast Asia, but also found elsewhere in Asia and in Australia

. The family is now considered as a junior synonym of the family Gecarcinucidae.

The Parathelphusinae inhabit rivers, lakes and rice paddies. Some species, for example from the genus Somanniathelphusa, are locally important as food, particularly in Thailand, Mizoram (India), etc. where they are an important ingredient in som tam. Some others are very rare and close to extinction such as the Parathelphusa reticulata, Singapore's Swamp Forest Crab.

Genera in this family are:

Adelaena
Arachnothelphusa
Austrothelphusa
Bakousa
Bassiathelphusa
Ceylonthelphusa
Clinothelphusa
Coccusa
Currothelphusa
Esanthelphusa
Geelvinkia
Geithusa
Heterothelphusa
Holthuisana
Irmengardia
Mahatha
Mainitia
Mekhongthelphusa
Migmathelphusa
Nautilothelphusa
Niasathelphusa
Oziotelphusa
Parathelphusa
Pastilla
Perbrinckia
Perithelphusa
Rouxana
Salangathelphusa
Sartoriana
Sayamia
Sendleria
Siamthelphusa
Somanniathelphusa
Spiralothelphusa
Stygothelphusa
Sundathelphusa
Syntripsa
Terrathelphusa
Thelphusula
Torhusa

References

The freshwater crabs of Danum Valley Conservation Area in Sabah, East Malaysia, with a description of a new species of Thelphusula Bott, 1969

External links

Gecarcinucoidea
Arthropod subfamilies

nl:Parathelphusidae